Obi Simbarashe Mhondera (born May 21, 1980 in Mutare, Zimbabwe) is a songwriter, producer and re-mixer responsible for many major releases worldwide, particularly in the United Kingdom, Europe and Asia.

Background
He was born and raised in Zimbabwe before moving to the United Kingdom. His first hit record was "Flip Reverse" which reached no. 2 in the UK Singles Chart. He since has worked with Sugababes, Blue, RBD, Boa, Dream, Jeremy Greene, Tata Young, Blazin' Squad, Billie Piper, Mutya Buena, Monrose, Room 2012, Queensberry, Cinema Bizarre, Jimi Blue and Jeanette Bierderman.

Madeleine McCann
Mhondera remixed the single "Missing (Where Are You?)", a song to aid Missing People in remembrance of Madeleine McCann.

Song Writing/ Production/ Credits
Cinema Bizarre " Modern Lover" Toyz
Cinema Bizarre " In Your Cage"  Toyz
Cinema Bizarre " Blasphemy" Toyz
Tata Young  "Suffocate"
KayCeeDee  "Bad Boy"
Blue
The Saturdays
Aggro Santos
Sef  "Need a Hero"
Sef   "Outta Da Ghetto"
Mutya Buena " Strung Out "
Chloe Wang "HeartBeat"
Shinee
Monrose (Strictly Physical) " Strictly Physical"
Monrose (Temptation) "Ooh la la"
Monrose (Temptation)  "Do That Dance"
Monrose (I AM "Going Out Tonite"
Room 2012 (8 songs on Album)
Kelley Key
Queensberry Volume 1 "Bike"
Queensberry Volume 1 "Sprung"
Fady Maalouf " Fire"
Tommy Reeve "Crying"
KAT-TUN
 TVXQ 
Culture Beat "The way you Move"
Jaoanna Zimmer  "In My Head"
Sarah Connor
Lisa Maffia
Smuji
Blazin' Squad " FLIP REVERSE"
Jimi Blue  "Do the ya"
Jimi Blue  "In Da Club"
Blazin' Squad   "Here for One"
Clea    "Stuck In The Middle"
Clea    " Sprung"
Nathan Nfg  " Come Into My Room"
Nathan Nfg   " Round and Round"
Triple 8  "Hit Da Bone"

Remixes Include
Christina Aguilera "Hurt"
Natasha Bedingfield "Wanna Have your Babies"
John Legend "Save Room"
Blue "If you Come Back"
3LW "Do Me Right"
3LW "Playas are gon Play"
Jagged Edge "Where The Party At"

References 

Zimbabwean record producers
Zimbabwean songwriters
Zimbabwean emigrants to the United Kingdom
1980 births
Living people